Nandi Awards for the year 2011 announced by Andhra Pradesh Government on 13 October 2012 Nandamuri Balakrishna starrer Sri Rama Rajyam won the best film award followed by Nagarjuna’s  Rajanna and Srikanth’s Virodhi. Mahesh Babu won Best actor Award for his  performance in the super hit film Dookudu. Akkineni Nagarjuna won the special jury award for his performance in  Rajanna  and Nayantara won the best actress award for her performance in Sri Ramarajyam.

Winners list

See also
Nandi Awards of 2010

References

2011
2011 Indian film awards